"Pineapple Morning" is a song by Dutch singer-songwriter Jett Rebel. It is the first track and single for his second album, Hits for Kids. It was released on October 30, 2014.

Charts

References

2014 singles
2014 songs
Jett Rebel songs